Ibrahim ibn Salm al-Bahili was an Arab governor of the early Abbasid Caliphate.

Ibrahim was the scion of a prominent family of the Bahila tribe: his father, Salm ibn Qutayba, had served both the Umayyads and the Abbasids as governor of Basra, and his grandfather had been the distinguished general Qutayba ibn Muslim. Several of his brothers and uncles also held high office. 

Ibrahim, like his brother Sa'id, was a close friend of Caliph al-Hadi, who appointed him governor of the Yemen. Indeed, according to an account preserved by al-Tabari, Ibrahim held the highest rank at court under al-Hadi, and after his death was succeeded by his own brother Sa'id.

References

Sources
 
 

8th-century births
8th-century deaths
8th-century Arabs
8th-century people from the Abbasid Caliphate
Abbasid governors of Yemen
Bahila